Bohannon is a surname. Notable people with the surname include: 

Camille Bohannon, American radio announcer and journalist
David D. Bohannon (1898-1995) American real estate developer, primarily in the San Francisco Bay Area
Etdrick Bohannon (born 1973), American basketball player
Fred Bohannon (born 1958), American football player
Hamilton Bohannon (1942–2020), American musician, band leader, and producer
Jason Bohannon (born 1987), American basketball player
Jim Bohannon (1944–2022), American radio show host
John Bohannon, science journalist
Jordan Bohannon (born 1997), American basketball player, brother of Jason